Athemistus cristatus is a species of beetle in the family Cerambycidae. It was described by Blackburn in 1894. It is known from Australia.

References

Athemistus
Beetles described in 1894